The Massachusetts general election, 2016 was held on November 8, 2016, throughout Massachusetts. All 160 seats of the Massachusetts House of Representatives and all 40 seats of the Massachusetts Senate were up for election. The primary election for state offices was held on September 8. Early voting was used for the first time, and took place from October 24 through November 4.

Federal Elections

Presidential election

Official state results from the Massachusetts Secretary of State are as follows

U.S. House

General Court

Summary
Senate

House of Representatives

State Senate

House of Representatives

Source: Secretary of the Commonwealth of Massachusetts, Ballotpedia (for information on incumbency)

Ballot measures 
Four statewide ballot measures were certified for the 2016 ballot.

References

External links
 

 
Massachusetts